St. Hovhannes Church was an Armenian church located in village of Jahri (Babek District) of the Nakhchivan Autonomous Republic of Azerbaijan. The church was located in the center of the village.

History 
The church was founded in the 12th or 13th century. It was renovated in the middle of the 17th century, according to the scribe of a Bible copied in 1640 in Jahri. The scribe is now in the Matenadaran manuscript library in Yerevan. The church was again renovated in the 19th century.

Architecture 
The church was consisting of an apse and two vestries, and was entered from the south. A tall cupula sat atop the roof, supported by arches and pillars. There were Armenian inscriptions on the southern and western facades.

Destruction 
The church was still standing in the late Soviet period. It was destroyed at some point between 1997 and October 24, 2009, as documented by Caucasus Heritage Watch.

References

External links
Report shows near-total erasure of Armenian heritage sites

Armenian churches in Azerbaijan
Ruins in Azerbaijan